is a Japanese professional baseball Pitcher for the Fukuoka SoftBank Hawks of Nippon Professional Baseball.

Professional career
On October 20, 2016, Furuya was drafted by the Fukuoka SoftBank Hawks in the 2016 Nippon Professional Baseball draft.

In 2017 - 2019 season, Furuya played in the Western League of NPB's minor leagues and played in informal matches against the Shikoku Island League Plus's teams. On May 5, 2019, he recorded the fastest 160km/h (99.42 mph) fastball in the a left-handed pitcher in the NPB's record in the informal match against the Kagawa Olive Guyners.

On July 5, 2020, Furuya debuted in the Pacific League against the Hokkaido Nippon-Ham Fighters as a relief pitcher. In 2020 season, he pitched 4 games in the Pacific League.

References

External links

 NPB.jp
 49 Yuto Furuya PLAYERS2021 - Fukuoka SoftBank Hawks Official site

1999 births
Living people
Fukuoka SoftBank Hawks players
Japanese baseball players
Nippon Professional Baseball pitchers
Baseball people from Hokkaido